Emily Gernild (born 1985) is a Danish painter and artist based in Copenhagen, Denmark.

Life and work 
Gernild was born 1985 in Odense, Denmark. From 2010 to 2016, she studied fine art at Funen Art Academy and Kunstakademie Düsseldorf where she was taught by Danish artists Tal R and Jens Haaning. Her work is part of the permanent collections of The Danish Arts Foundation, Trapholt Museum for Modern Art and Kastrupgårdsamlingen.

Gernild's abstract paintings often include compositions of classical still life subjects. Everyday objects such as vegetables, fruits, flowers, plants, seeds, jugs and bottles are recurring motifs. Using dynamic brushstrokes on large canvases, Gernild paints with rabbit-skin glue mixed with pigments along using traditional materials including oil and stick, watercolor, gesso and acrylic.

Her paintings reference 16th century Dutch still life paintings, Edvard Munch’s Symbolism, surrealist dreamlike scenes and draw upon the traditions of female Nordic painters such as Hilma af Klint. In the publication 'Touched - Danish Art in the New Millennium', art critic Maria Kjær Themsen writes that:

Both Anna Ancher, Christine Swane and Anna Syberg are Danish painters who are known for their interior and floral motifs. Gernild adds a far more curved and lively virtuosity to the tradition, where voluminous flowers fill the entire canvas and become abstract. She uses the colors so that they form structures and not just figuration in a very sensuous painting that unites the art historical heritage with the fabulous color of the 00s.

Her solo exhibition ‘Unaffected - Emily Gernild & Christine Swane’ at Rønnebæksholm Museum presented Gernild’s contemporary paintings in dialogue with Christine Swane’s artistic work and her connection to the Funen Painters. A selection of her lithographs were shown alongside works by CoBrA-artist Corneille, Chinese-American artist Walasse Ting and American artist John Chamberlain in the exhibition 'Colour as the driving force' in 2021. Gammel Holtegaard Museum announced in 2022 that it will stage a solo exhibition on Gernild's work in 2023. She has held solo exhibitions at Schwarz Contemporary in Berlin, M100 Exhibition Space in Odense, Galleri Bo Bjerggaard in Copenhagen and OSL Contemporary on Oslo.  Her work has been included in group exhibitions at Arken Museum for Modern Art, Trapholt Museum for Modern Art, Gammel Holtegaard, Rundetaarn, Kastrupgårdsamlingen, Janus Vestjyllands Art Museum and Gammelgaard Art & Culture Museum. 

She has created public art commissions for Holbæk Art (2020), the Danish Ministry of Education (2019) and The Maritime and Commercial High Court in Denmark (2012). She received the honorary grant from Niels Wessel Bagge Art Foundation in 2021 and was selected to create the statue Årets Harald by Royal Copenhagen and The University of Copenhagen in 2018.

Publications 

 Vibeke Kelding Hansen and Lisbeth Bonde (2019). Upåagtet - Emily Gernild & Christine Swane; Rønnebæksholm Museum. 
 Milena Høgsberg and Grant Klarich Johnson (June 2021). Emily Gernild: Black Lemons. Kerber Verlag. 
 Anna Walter Ed. (2022), Kassandras søstre – fremtidens malere hæver forbandelsen (in Danish). Denmark, Rundetaarn.

See also 

 List of Danish women artists
 Funen painters

References 

Danish women painters
21st-century Danish women artists

1985 births
Living people